Vindication (January 28, 2000 in Kentucky – July 10, 2008) was an American Thoroughbred Champion racehorse. Bred by Payson Stud Inc., he was sired by 1977 U.S. Triple Crown Champion Seattle Slew.

Vindication was purchased for $2.15 million at the 2001 Fasig-Tipton Saratoga sale by Satish Sanan's Padua Stables of Ocala, Florida, who  handed him over to trainer Bob Baffert for race conditioning. Sent to the track at age two, Vindication won his first two races at Del Mar Racetrack in California. Then, on September 14 at Turfway Park in Florence, Kentucky, he captured the Grade III Kentucky Cup Juvenile Stakes by six lengths. He was then sent to Chicago's Arlington Park for the 2002 Breeders' Cup Juvenile. Though the race was normally run at a distance of 11/16 miles, the track setup at Arlington Park meant that year's Juvenile was raced at 1⅛ miles. Ridden by Mike Smith, Vindication won by  lengths over Kafwain and Hold That Tiger, the latter a highly regarded colt from Ireland trained by Aidan O'Brien.

The runaway winner in the voting for 2002 American Champion Two-Year-Old Colt honors, Vindication was the winterbook favorite for the following spring's Kentucky Derby. However, as a result of a serious injury sustained early in 2003, Vindication never  raced again and was retired.

A 2003 Keeneland Magazine article by Deirdre B. Biles called Vindication "one of the hottest stallion prospects in the country." 

John G. Sikura purchased a one-third interest in the breeding rights to Vindication and since 2004 the horse has been standing at stud at his Hill 'n' Dale Farms in Lexington, Kentucky. His stud fee was $60,000. Vindication covered 78 mares in the 2007 season.

Vindication was euthanized on July 10, 2008 after suffering from a stomach rupture.

Race Record 

Average win margin: 4 lengths

See also
List of leading Thoroughbred racehorses

References
 Vindication's pedigree and partial racing stats
 Video at YouTube of Vindication winning the 2002 Breeders' Cup Juvenile
 News article alerting the public of Vindication's sudden death

2000 racehorse births
2008 racehorse deaths
Breeders' Cup Juvenile winners
Eclipse Award winners
Racehorses bred in Kentucky
Racehorses trained in the United States
Undefeated racehorses
Thoroughbred family 1-s